Variovorax defluvii is a Gram-negative, non-spore-forming, motile bacterium from the genus Variovorax, which was isolated from the sewage in the Geumho River in Korea.

References

External links
Type strain of Variovorax defluvii at BacDive -  the Bacterial Diversity Metadatabase

Comamonadaceae
Bacteria described in 2012